Lo Siento may refer to:

 "Lo Siento" (Belinda Peregrín song), 2003
 "Lo Siento" (Super Junior song), 2018 single featuring Leslie Grace and Play-N-Skillz
 "Lo Siento", a song by Beret, 2018
 "Lo Siento", a song by the band formerly known as Sombrero Verde from their eponymous album, 1981